Roy McKie (usually spelled McKié; October 8, 1921 – January 8, 2015) was an American writer and illustrator of children's books, most notably under the Beginner Books imprint. He illustrated many books penned by Theodor Seuss Geisel (Dr. Seuss) under the pen name Theo. LeSieg ("Geisel" spelled backwards).

Books illustrated by McKie (books he wrote himself are marked with *) include:

 The Big Orange Book of Beginner Books by Dr. Seuss - 2015 (with Dr. Seuss, Scott Nash and Michael Frith) (his final work after his death)
 The Big Purple Book of Beginner Books by Helen Palmer, P.D. and Peter Eastman and Michael Frith - 2012 (with P.D. and Peter Eastman)
 Skiing by Henry Beard – 2002
 Sailing by Henry Beard – 2001 – dictionary of funny sailing terms
 Computing by Henry Beard – 1999
 The Big Green Book of Beginner Books by Dr. Seuss - 1997 (with Quentin Blake, B. Tobey, George Booth, Michael J. Smollin and James Stevenson)
 A Big Ball of String by Marion Holland – 1993 (35th anniversary edition)
 A Dictionary of Silly Words About Growing Up by Henry Beard — 1988
  Golfing by Henry Beard – 1987 dictionary of funny golfing terms
 Cooking by Henry Beard – 1985 dictionary of funny cooking terms
 Noah's Ark - 1984
 Fishing by Henry Beard – 1983 dictionary of funny fishing terms
 Ship's Log by Henry Beard – 1983 dictionary of funny nautical terms
 Gardening, A Gardeners Dictionary By Henry Beard – 1982 – dictionary of funny gardening terms.
 The Tooth Book by Dr. Seuss (writing as Theo. LeSieg) – 1981 (the 2000 edition replaces McKie's illustrations with new ones by Joe Mathieu, animated by Topcraft in 1984.)
 The Joke Book* – 1979
 The Hair Book by Graham Tether – 1979 (in 2019, the 40th anniversary edition replaces McKie's illustrations with new ones by Andrew Joyner)
 Dog* – 1978
 The Riddle Book* – 1978
 Roy McKie's Zodiac Book* – 1977
 Would You Rather Be a Bullfrog? by Dr. Seuss (writing as Theo. LeSieg) – 1975
 The Many Mice of Mr. Brice by Dr. Seuss (writing as Theo. LeSieg) - 1973 (the 1989 edition replaces this title with new ones called The Pop-Up Mice of Mr. Brice, and later in early 2015 and early 2021, the 2015 and 2021 editions replace the pop-up book with new board books)
 In a People House by Dr. Seuss (writing as Theo. LeSieg) – 1972
 I Can Write a book by ME, Myself with a little help from Dr. Seuss (writing as Theo. LeSieg) – 1971
 The Nose Book by Al Perkins – 1970 (the 2002 edition replaces McKie's illustrations with new ones by Joe Mathieu)
 My Book About Me by ME, Myself with some little help from my friend Dr. Seuss  – 1969
 The Eye Book by Dr. Seuss (writing as Theo. LeSieg) – 1968 (the 1999 edition replaces McKie's illustrations with new ones by Joe Mathieu)
 Bennett Cerf's Book of Animal Riddles by Bennett Cerf – 1964
 Summer by Alice Low – 1963 (2001 recolor edition without banned pages)
 Snow by P. D. Eastman – 1962
 More Riddles by Bennett Cerf – 1961 (the 1999 edition replaces McKie's illustrations with new ones by Debbie Palen part of Riddles and More Riddles!)
 Ten Apples Up on Top by Dr. Seuss (writing as Theo. LeSieg) – 1961 (1998 recolor Bright and Early Board Book edition [with new 2004 recolor Beginner Book pages added], animated by Sullivan Bluth Studios in 1989) – Counting book for children
 Bennett Cerf's Book of Riddles by Bennett Cerf – 1960 (the 1999 edition replaces McKie's illustrations with new ones by Debbie Palen part of Riddles and More Riddles!)
The Greats Family comic books by Roy McKie & Dr. Seuss – 1946 (his first work)
''Mr. Wizard's Supermarket Science by Don Herbert - 1980

References

1921 births
2015 deaths
American illustrators
Dr. Seuss
American children's writers